Carate-Calò railway station is a railway station in Italy. Located on the Monza–Molteno railway, it serves the municipality of Carate in Lombardy. The train services are operated by Trenord.

Train services 
The station is served by the following service(s):

Milan Metropolitan services (S7) Milan - Molteno - Lecco

See also 
 Milan suburban railway network

References 

Railway stations in Lombardy
Milan S Lines stations
Railway stations opened in 1911